Liaoning Guangyuan Football Club (Chinese: 辽宁广原足球俱乐部) was a Chinese professional soccer club which played in Singapore's S.League as a foreign team in the 2007 season. The club was a satellite team of the Chinese Super League club Liaoning FC. Players from Liaoning's youth teams made up the majority of Liaoning Guangyuan's S.League squad. The team played their home games at the Queenstown Stadium. They finished in 10th place out of 12 teams in the S.League in 2007.

The club did not participate in the S.League in 2008 as Football Association of Singapore (FAS) did not invite them back for another season.

History 
In 2008, FAS decided not to invite Liaoning Guangyuan to participate in the S.League again. They were replaced in the league by Dalian Shide Siwu FC.

Match-fixing scandal 

In January 2008, the Singapore media reported that Liaoning Guangyuan's Team Manager Wang Xin had been arrested following an investigation by Singapore's Corrupt Practices Investigation Bureau into alleged match-fixing. Eight players from the team also had had their passports impounded pending investigations. Shortly after the scandal broke, the Football Association of Singapore announced that it would not be inviting Liaoning Guangyuan to participate in the S.League again in 2008.

Investigations showed that Wang had arranged for a friend in China to place online bets on some of Liaoning Guangyuan's matches through a China-based betting website. He then approached certain players individually and asked them to help ensure the team would lose the match by a particular number of goals in return for bribes.

Wang posted bail and left Singapore for China to attend a court hearing. However, he failed to return to Singapore on 16 January 2008 for a hearing on the charges. He was eventually detained in Shenyang by the China's Police Force in April 2009 following his alleged involvement in a match-fixing scandal in China.

Seven Liaoning Guangyuan players were charged and pleaded guilty to accepting amounts ranging between S$1,200 and S$4,000 from Wang to throw games. Li Xuebai, Li Zheng, Dong Lei, Peng Zhiyi, Tong Di and Zhao Zhipeng received jail sentences of five months, while Wang Lin was sentenced to four months. Each of the six players also received fines ranging from S$2,200 to S$6,200.

Seasons

Players for 2007 season

References

External links 
 S.League website page on Liaoning Guangyuan FC

Liaoning F.C.
Foreign teams in Singapore football leagues
Singapore Premier League clubs
Expatriated football clubs